Grace Mwafulirwa Mhango (born 24 December 1987) is a Malawian netball player who plays for Malawi in the positions of goal defense or wing defense. She has featured in three consecutive World Cup tournaments for Malawi in 2011, 2015 and in 2019. She has also competed at the Commonwealth Games on three successive occasions in 2010 and 2014 representing Malawi.

In September 2019, she was included in the Malawian squad for the 2019 African Netball Championships.

References 

1987 births
Living people
Malawian netball players
Netball players at the 2010 Commonwealth Games
Netball players at the 2014 Commonwealth Games
Commonwealth Games competitors for Malawi
2019 Netball World Cup players